Mitsuyuki Funamizu (born 7 September 1933) is a Japanese foil and sabre fencer. He competed at the 1960 and 1964 Summer Olympics.

References

External links
 

1933 births
Living people
Japanese male foil fencers
Olympic fencers of Japan
Fencers at the 1960 Summer Olympics
Fencers at the 1964 Summer Olympics
Sportspeople from Aomori Prefecture
Japanese male sabre fencers
21st-century Japanese people
20th-century Japanese people